Senator Ely may refer to:

Frederick D. Ely (1838–1921), Massachusetts State Senate
John Ely (Iowa politician) (1919–2007), Iowa State Senate
Sumner Ely (1787–1857), New York State Senate
William H. J. Ely (1891–1942), New Jersey State Senate